Pseudopostega myxodes is a moth of the family Opostegidae. It was described by Edward Meyrick in 1916. It is known from Bihar, India.

References

Opostegidae
Moths described in 1916